The 2021 Northern Iowa Panthers football team represented the University of Northern Iowa in the 2021 NCAA Division I FCS football season. The Panthers competed as members of the Missouri Valley Football Conference and were led by 21st-year head coach Mark Farley. They played their home games at UNI-Dome in Cedar Falls, Iowa.

Schedule

Game Summaries

at Iowa State

Players drafted into the NFL

References

Northern Iowa
Northern Iowa Panthers football seasons
2021 NCAA Division I FCS playoff participants
Northern Iowa Panthers football